Sleepers is a 1996 American legal crime drama film written, produced, and directed by Barry Levinson, and based on Lorenzo Carcaterra's 1995 book of the same name. The film stars Kevin Bacon, Jason Patric, Brad Pitt, Robert De Niro, Dustin Hoffman, Minnie Driver, Vittorio Gassman, Brad Renfro, Ron Eldard, Jeffrey Donovan, Terry Kinney, Joe Perrino, Geoffrey Wigdor, Jonathan Tucker, Bruno Kirby and Billy Crudup. The title is a slang term for juvenile delinquents who serve sentences longer than nine months.

Sleepers was theatrically released in the United States on October 18, 1996 and was a box-office hit, grossing $165.6 million against a $44 million budget.

Plot
Lorenzo "Shakes" Carcaterra, Tommy Marcano, Michael Sullivan, and John Reilly are childhood friends living in Hell's Kitchen in the 1960s. Father "Bobby" Carillo, their parish priest and a youth offender himself in the past, tries to teach them right from wrong. They still play pranks and start running small errands for local gangster King Benny.

In the summer of 1967, the four boys steal a hotdog cart, which they accidentally roll down the subway stairs, severely injuring an elderly man. They are all sentenced to serve time at a juvenile detention center called Wilkinson Home for Boys in Upstate New York; Shakes is given 6 to 12 months, while the others are given 12 to 18 months. During their stay, they are constantly subjected to sexual abuse and torture by head guards Sean Nokes, Henry Addison, Ralph Ferguson and Adam Styler.

While at the facility, they participate in Wilkinson's annual football game between the guards and inmates. Michael convinces inmate Rizzo Robinson to help win the game. Humiliated, the guards move the boys to solitary confinement for weeks, where they are systematically beaten. Rizzo does not survive and his family is told that he had died of pneumonia.

In the spring of 1968, shortly before Shakes' release from Wilkinson, he suggests the boys publicly report the abuse. The others refuse, with Michael asserting that no one would believe them or care, and they vow never to speak of it again. The night before Shakes is released, Nokes and the other guards arrange a "farewell party" in which the four boys are again brutally abused to a higher extreme.

In 1981, John and Tommy, now career criminals, unexpectedly encounter Sean Nokes in a Hell's Kitchen pub. Confronting him, he dismisses the abuse he put them through, and John and Tommy shoot him dead in front of witnesses. Michael, now an assistant district attorney, gets himself assigned to the case; he secretly intends to botch the prosecution and expose what the guards at Wilkinson's did. With Shakes, now a reporter, they form a plan to free John and Tommy and get revenge on the other Wilkinson abusers. With the help of King Benny and Carol, their childhood friend, they carry out their plan using information compiled by Michael on the backgrounds of the guards, helped by Danny Snyder, an alcoholic lawyer, to defend John and Tommy.

Michael secretly drafts scripted questions in advance, so Snyder casts significant doubt on the testimony of a woman who witnessed the murder, and two other witnesses are intimidated into silence. For Michael's plan to fully succeed, however, he must damage Nokes' reputation and convincingly place John and Tommy at another location at the time of the shooting. When called as a witness, Ferguson, now a social worker, admits that Nokes and the other guards systematically abused the boys. To clinch the case, however, a key witness was still needed for John and Tommy's alibi. Shakes has a long talk with Father Bobby, who resists at first, but after learning the truth, reluctantly agrees to perjure himself. At trial, Father Bobby testifies John and Tommy were with him at a New York Knicks game at the time of the shooting and shows three ticket stubs to prove it. As a result, John and Tommy are acquitted.

The remaining guards are also punished for their crimes: Henry Addison, now a politician who still molests children, is abducted and killed near the local airport by gangsters led by Rizzo's older brother, Eddie "Little Caesar" Robinson, who heard the truth about Rizzo's death from King Benny; Adam Styler, now a corrupt police officer, is imprisoned for taking bribes and murdering a drug dealer; and Ralph Ferguson is implied to have faced legal consequences following his courtroom admission of sexual abusing and torturing the boys.

Michael, Shakes, John, Tommy, and Carol meet at a local bar to celebrate. It is the last time the four are together. Shakes remains in Hell's Kitchen as a reporter; Michael quits the DA's office, moves to the English countryside, becomes a carpenter and never marries; John and Tommy both die before age 30 – John succumbs to alcohol poisoning due to excessive consumption while Tommy is ambushed and murdered by rival criminals. Carol remains in Hell's Kitchen as a social worker; she has a son, naming him John Thomas Michael Martinez, with the nickname "Shakes".

Cast

 Billy Crudup as Thomas “Tommy” Marcano 
 Jonathan Tucker as Young Tommy Marcano
 Ron Eldard as John Riley
 Geoffrey Wigdor as Young John Riley
 Jason Patric as Lorenzo 'Shakes' Carcaterra
 Joe Perrino as Young Shakes
 Brad Pitt as Michael Sullivan 
 Brad Renfro as Young Michael Sullivan
 Kevin Bacon as Sean Nokes
 Robert De Niro as Father Robert “Bobby” Carillo
 Minnie Driver as Carol Martinez 
 Monica Polito as Young Carol Martinez
 Vittorio Gassman as Benny 'King Benny'
 Dustin Hoffman as Danny Snyder
 Terry Kinney as Ralph Ferguson
 Peter McRobbie as lawyer
 Bruno Kirby as Shakes' father
 Frank Medrano as 'Fat' Mancho
 Eugene Byrd as Rizzo Robinson
 Jeffrey Donovan as Henry Addison
 Wendell Pierce as Eddie 'Little Caesar' Robinson
 Aida Turturro as Mrs. Salinas
 Dash Mihok as K.C.
 Angela Rago as Shakes' mother
 John Slattery as Mr. Carlson

Production
The first words spoken in the film are: "This is a true story about friendship that runs deeper than blood". However, the truthfulness and factual accuracy of the film—and the book upon which it is based—were challenged by the Sacred Heart of Jesus Church and School in Manhattan (the school attended by Lorenzo Carcaterra) and by the Manhattan District Attorney's office, among others. Carcaterra has acknowledged that most details in the book were fictionalized, but maintained that the events described in the book actually occurred.

Release

Box office
In its opening weekend the film grossed $12.3 million from 1,915 theaters in the United States and Canada, debuting atop of the box office. Sleepers grossed $53.3 million domestically and $112.3 million internationally, for a worldwide total of $165.6 million.

Critical response 
On Rotten Tomatoes the film holds an approval approval rating of 73% based on 56 reviews, with an average rating of 6.60/10. The site's critics consensus reads: "Old friendships are awakened by the need for revenge, making Sleepers a haunting nightmare burdened by voiceover yet terrifically captured by Barry Levinson." Metacritic assigned the film a weighted average score of 49 out of 100 based on 18 critics, indicating "mixed or average reviews".  Audiences polled by CinemaScore gave the film an average grade of "A−" on an A+ to F scale.

Critics praised the performances of De Niro, Hoffman, Bacon, and the young cast, as well as the cinematography and production design. However, multiple critics said the film loses focus in its second half. Owen Gleiberman of Entertainment Weekly wrote, "Sleepers wants to do something impossible — merge the mournful, drenched-in-shame emotions of child abuse with the huckster gamesmanship of a contraption like The Sting."

David Ansen of Newsweek criticized Levinson's script and reasoned the adult characters of Shakes, Michael, John, and Tommy were not fully fleshed out. Roger Ebert awarded the film three out of four stars, but said it did not engage enough in the moral issues it purported to be about. Steve Davis of The Austin Chronicle wrote, "What a more interesting film this would have been had Levinson found a way to integrate the past and the present so that one informed the other."

When the film was released, there was controversy over how much of the novel, claimed to be a true story, had been invented by its author.

Accolades

Home media
The film was released on VHS by Warner Home Video in 1997. The film was released in DVD on November 3, 2009 and also in Blu-Ray on August 2, 2011. It is also included on streaming service, Prime Video.

Notes

References

External links
 
 
 
 

1996 films
1996 crime drama films
American coming-of-age films
American courtroom films
American crime drama films
American buddy drama films
American prison drama films
1990s buddy drama films
1990s English-language films
Films about child sexual abuse
Films about pranks
Films directed by Barry Levinson
Films scored by John Williams
Films produced by Steve Golin
Films based on American novels
Films set in 1967
Films set in 1968
Films set in 1981
Films set in New York (state)
Films set in New York City
Films shot in Connecticut
Films shot in New York City
PolyGram Filmed Entertainment films
American rape and revenge films
Warner Bros. films
Films about the Irish Mob
1990s American films